Jonathan Rae Whitesell (born August 28, 1991) is a Canadian actor known for his role as Luke Matthews in the Freeform 2017 science fiction drama Beyond. He later played several high-profile recurring roles as Bryan and Kurtz respectively in The CW series The 100 and Riverdale, as well as Robin Goodfellow in the Netflix supernatural horror series Chilling Adventures of Sabrina.

Whitesell has also starred in several films, most notably The Kill Team (2019).

Early life
After graduating high school, Whitsell joined the military, following in the footsteps of his father, who was already enrolled, and his grandfather who was a police officer. Although he had enjoyed acting since he was eight years old, he did not see it as a lucrative career, and it was not until he went through a particularly difficult period in his life that Whitesell decided to try and focus on something he loved and registered for the acting program at Capilano University.

Career
Between 2016 and 2017, Whitesell appeared in a recurring role as Bryan on the third and fourth seasons of The CW's dystopian science fiction series The 100. Bryan is introduced as the boyfriend of established character Nathan Miller. On the significance of his role, he explained "[Bryan and Miller] were two kind of almost alpha males from each station and the relationship was not based in stereotype and it's so cool being in this universe, sexuality isn't such a pertinent thing". He also added that playing an LGBT character was an "honour". Discussing his guest role as Hercules in "Labor of Love", the thirteenth episode of the fifth season of ABC fantasy drama Once Upon a Time, Whitsell admitted that he was "stoked" the moment he read the script and thought his story arc was "refreshing" and "interesting", adding that he liked "the new take" on the character as it was very different from how he was portrayed in the 1997 Disney film. He also praised director Billy Gierhart and actress Ginnifer Goodwin for their support on set.

In 2016, Witesell was cast as a series regular on the Freeform series Beyond. Filming for the first season began on April 5, 2016. Describing the casting process, he explained that he "originally auditioned for the role of Holden. It was a bit of a whirlwind experience that started with a taping, three auditions and a test over the span of a couple of months. It was a couple of weeks after my test I found out I didn't get the part. It was tough to digest the news, but I was thrilled about the whole experience nonetheless. It wasn't until about three weeks later that I got the call saying that they were going to offer me the role of Luke instead! The whole process took about three months, and I was very emotionally invested, so when I got the news it was mind blowing". The show was cancelled after its second season.

Whitesell's casting in Dan Krauss' war film The Kill Team was announced on November 1, 2017, following a six- week shoot that concluded in Spain on October 20, 2017. The film premiered at the Tribeca Film Festival on April 27, 2019, before being theatrically released by A24 on October 25 that same year.

In late 2019, Whitesell was cast in the third season of Netflix's Chilling Adventures of Sabrina. Of his role, Deadline reported that Whitesell would "play Robin, a handsome young man with an 'elfish' quality to him" and that, though the character is "caring and sweet", he was also a "mischief maker" and "perhaps something more dangerous" who would develop feelings for regular cast member Lachlan Watson's Theo.

Personal life
Whitesell enjoys drawing, painting, photography and directing short films. He also enjoys playing tabletop Dungeons & Dragons as well as the video games Halo and Overwatch and is a fan of Game of Thrones and Star Wars. He has an interest in computer hardware and built his own PC.

Filmography

Film

Television

References

External links
 
 
 

1991 births
21st-century Canadian male actors
Canadian male film actors
Canadian male television actors
Canadian male voice actors
Living people